Maxim Hani Khalil (born on 7 November 1978 in Homs) is a Syrian actor.

Career 
After he finished high school, he began as ballet dancer, then became a basketball player in youth and professional level. In 1998, he worked as an assistant director for two years and was at this stage performing small roles. Since 2000, he began his real career and presented many works like Maraya, Ahl Algharam, Aldhaher Baibars, and Robi. He also worked as a voice actor in many anime and Turkish television series.

Personal life

Parents 
Maxim born to a Syrian Christian father and a Russian mother; he held Russian citizenship due to his mother. His father Hany Khalil was a politician and military analyst. He had many compositions and lectures; he died in 1997. His mother Stila Tomolovic is a makeup artist and fashion designer. In 2017, many fans criticized him after many newspapers published that he left his mother in a retirement home in Damascus.

Marriages 
In 1998, he married an actress Yara Khalil then they divorced in 2003; later Maxim Khalil in 2013 admitted that he regretted cheating on her. In 2004, he married another Syrian actress Sawsan Arshid who is also Russian by her mother. He has three sons: Hany from his former wife Yara, Jad and Lucas from his current wife.

Syrian Revolution 
Khalil was known as one of biggest Syrian celebrities who stood with the Syrian Revolution 2011 against the Bashar al-Assad government. In March 2014, he announced his support of the Syrian revolution with his wife. In 2015, they were on wanted lists drawn up by the Syrian government's Political Security Directorate and General Intelligence Directorate. He also criticized the Free Syrian Army; he accused them of working for foreign interests to divide Syria.

Filmography 
 1998 Al baher Al ayob
 2001 Searching for Saladin
 2001 Abu Tayeb Al mutanabi
 2001 Ser Alnawar
 2002 Saqar Quraish
 2002 Zaman Alwasel
 2003 Onshodat Almatar
 2003 Cordoba spring
 2004 Maraya
 2004 Al-Taghreba al-Falastenya
 2005 Big dreams
 2005 Altareq
 2005 Aldhaher Bebars
 2006 Ahel Algharam
 2006 Revenge of flower
 2006 Ala tol Alayam
 2006 Gazeles in forests of wolves
 2007 Shadow of woman
 2007 Narrow corridors
 2008 Partners share destruction
 2008 Hek Itjawzna
 2008 Another rainfull day
 2009 Zaman Al'ar
 2010 Takht Sharqi
 2011 Birth from waist
 2012 Robi as Omar
 2013 The Doubt
 2015 Tomorrow we meet
 2016 Ya reet
 2017 Night
 2018 Coma
 2019 Dream Maker
 2020 The Platform
 2021 As Far as I Can Walk

Voice 
 Gümüş as Mehmet Şadoğlu 
 Detective Conan as Kaito Kid

Awards 
 2009 Adonia award for best supporting actor for his role Zaman Al'ar.
 2013 Murex d'Or as best Arab actor for his role in Rubi.

References

External links 
 Maxim Khalil in IMDb

1978 births
Living people
People from Homs
Syrian male actors
Syrian people of Russian descent
Syrian people of Armenian descent
Syrian men's basketball players
Russian male actors
Syrian Christians
Syrian dissidents